William Russell (born 1903) was a Scottish footballer who played as a right half for Chelsea and Heart of Midlothian.

His son Billy was also a footballer.

References

1903 births
Year of death unknown
Scottish footballers
Footballers from Hamilton, South Lanarkshire
Association football wing halves
Scottish Junior Football Association players
Scottish Football League players
English Football League players
Blantyre Victoria F.C. players
Rhyl F.C. players
Chelsea F.C. players
Heart of Midlothian F.C. players